Air Vice Marshal Sir Alan Hunter Cachemaille Boxer,  (1 December 1916 – 26 April 1998) was a senior Royal Air Force officer.

Early life
Boxer was born in Hastings, New Zealand, on 1 December 1916, and was educated at Nelson College from 1927 to 1935.

RAF career
Boxer joined the Royal Air Force in January 1939 and saw service during the Second World War as a pilot with No. 161 Squadron at RAF Tempsford, as a flight commander with No. 138 Squadron and then as Commanding Officer of No. 161 Squadron from 1943. He continued his war service on the staff in the Directorate of Intelligence at the Air Ministry from September 1943 and then on the staff at Headquarters RAF Bomber Command from February 1945.

Boxer remained in the Royal Air Force after the war. Boxer flew B-29s over Korea while on secondment to the USAF. He became Officer Commanding No. 7 Squadron in 1956, Station Commander at RAF Wittering in 1958 and Group Captain responsible for Plans at Headquarters Bomber Command in 1959. He went on to be Senior Air Staff Officer at Headquarters No. 1 Group in 1963, Senior Air Staff Officer at Headquarters RAF Bomber Command in 1965 and Defence Services Secretary in 1967 before retiring in 1970.

References

 

1916 births
1998 deaths
New Zealand Companions of the Distinguished Service Order
New Zealand Companions of the Order of the Bath
New Zealand Knights Commander of the Royal Victorian Order
People educated at Nelson College
People from Hastings, New Zealand
Recipients of the Distinguished Flying Cross (United Kingdom)
Recipients of the Air Medal
Royal Air Force air marshals
Royal Air Force pilots of World War II
Recipients of the Silver Cross of the Virtuti Militari